Superior High School (SHS) is one of two high schools in Superior, Wisconsin, the other being Maranatha Academy. The School District of Superior opened SHS in 1965 as Superior Senior High School (SSHS) to replace East and Central High Schools. Those schools became middle schools, which were both closed and torn down in 2003. (An office building built on part of Central's site was completed in 2008 and a housing project was built on East's site, the last lot being developed in 2012).

The high school serves about 1,600 students in grades 9–12 with a staff of around 150. SHS' mission is to "Provide all children with the relevant tools to develop a foundation for living, learning and working successfully."

Academics 
Superior High School offers a wide selection of classes. Several selections in English, History/Social Studies, Science, Mathematics, Foreign Language, Music, Physical Education, Business, Art, and Technical Education classes are available. Superior High School also offers many Advanced Placement courses, including: AP Literature and Composition, AP Calculus, AP United States History, AP World History, AP Physics, AP Chemistry, AP Biology, and AP Psychology. It also offers several College in the Schools (CITS) courses, which give students the opportunity to earn college credits through Lake Superior College, courses offered in this category include: CITS Precalculus, Communications, and Anatomy and Physiology.

By enrolling in an AP course, students have the opportunity to take the AP Exam in the spring of the year in which they took the course, which allows students the chance to earn college credit if a sufficient score is achieved on the test. Beginning in the 2008-2009 school year, all students enrolled in AP courses at Superior High School are required to take the AP Exam for each course they took.

Required classes

Requirements for graduation

All students must accumulate 22 credits in grades 9-12 in addition to one-half credit of Health in grades 7-12, and register for a minimum of 5.5 credits each year. Students may take up to 7 credits per year. One credit of English is required each year in grades 9-12; one credit of Social Studies/History is required each year, two credits of Math are required including one credit of algebra, two years of Science (9th grade Science and 10th grade Biology); and one-half credit of Physical Education each year in grades 9, 10, and 11. Also one-half credit of Keystone is required for the graduating class of 2006 and beyond. All seniors must complete a Senior Project in order to graduate. A student may take up to seven credits per school year (there are seven class hours). A student must take a minimum of five and one-half credits. Students are recommended, in most cases, to take a minimum of six credits.

Co-curricular activities 

SHS offers many opportunities to involve students in co-curricular activities. Some options include:

Athletics 
Superior, Wisconsin borders Minnesota, and, as a result, SHS's athletic teams primarily compete with schools located in Minnesota, like Denfeld High School, East High School, Proctor High School, and Cloquet High School.

Wisconsin high schools that SHS competes with include Ashland, Eau Claire, Hudson, and New Richmond.

Athletic activities available to students include the following:

All activities listed include a Varsity and Junior Varsity team (unless otherwise specified) except Girls Hockey and Track which only have Varsity teams.

Scholarship opportunities
Many scholarship are also available for students planning to attend two-year or four-year higher learning institutions. The Superior Scholarship Foundation administers many, with the largest being the Victor and Mary D. Nelson Scholarship, which grants scholarships worth up to $6,000. This requires an in-depth application, writing sample, interview, and references.

Many local businesses, organizations, and alumni have, and continue to contribute scholarships to Superior High School students.

Notable alumni
 Morrie Arnovich, MLB outfielder, played for the Philadelphia Phillies, the Cincinnati Reds and the New York Giants.
 Niko Bogojevic, professional wrestler
 Esther Bubley, photojournalist, contributor to Life and Ladies' Home Journal.  Bubley captured thousands of photographs for the Farm Security Administration during the 1940s and 1950s.
 Bud Engdahl, professional basketball player; attended when it was still Superior Central High School
 Bruce Mathison, NFL quarterback, played for the San Diego Chargers, the Buffalo Bills and the Seattle Seahawks
 Doug Sutherland, NFL player, played for the New Orleans Saints, the Minnesota Vikings and the Seattle Seahawks
 Oliver E. Williamson, recipient of the 2009 Nobel Memorial Prize in Economic Sciences.  Attended Central High School in 1950.

References

External links
 Superior High School
 Great Schools Inc

Public high schools in Wisconsin
Schools in Douglas County, Wisconsin
Educational institutions established in 1965
Superior, Wisconsin
1965 establishments in Wisconsin